Henry Burger or Berger may refer to:

 Heinrich Bürger (1804–1858), German scientist
 Henry Berger (1826–1864), American organ builder
 Henry B. Burger, American founder of the Burger Boat Company
 Henri Berger (1844–1929), Prussian-Hawaiian composer and bandmaster
 Henry Burger (died 1936), Swiss-Canadian restaurateur and founder of Café Henry Burger
 Heinrich Burger (1881–1942), German figure skater
 Hank Berger (1952–2006), American nightclub owner

See also
 Henry's Hamburgers, a former United States fast-food chain